The Ministry of Natural Resources and Environment (MONRE) is a government ministry in Vietnam responsible for: land, water resources; mineral resources, geology; environment; hydrometeorology; climate change;
surveying and mapping; management of the islands and the sea.

Ministerial units
 Department of Planning
 Department of Finance
 Department of International Cooperations
 Department of Science and Technology
 Department of Legislation
 Department of Organisation and Personnel
 Ministry Inspectorate
 Ministry Office in Ho Chi Minh City
 Agency for Land Management
 Agency for Sea and Islands
 Agency for Environment
 Agency for Geology and Mineral
 Agency for Water Resources Management
 Agency for Information Technology
 Agency for Meteorology Climate Change
 Agency for Survey and Mapping
 Agency for Remote Sensing

Administrative units 

 Natural Resources and Environment Newspaper
 Natural Resources and Environment Magazine
 Viet Nam Natural Resources, Environment and Cartography Publishing House One Member Company Limited

Natural Resources
Governmental office in Hanoi
Vietnam, Natural Resources
Vietnam
Vietnam